ENSV can stand for:
 Estonian Soviet Socialist Republic, a former Soviet state (soviet occupation form) ( in Estonian)
 Higher National Veterinary School,  in French